Della Destiara Haris (born 8 December 1992) is an Indonesian badminton player affiliated with Jaya Raya Jakarta club. In the junior event, she was the mixed doubles silver medalist at the 2009 World Junior Championships, and also the mixed team and doubles bronze medalists at the 2010 Asian Junior Championships. She won her first international title in 2010 Indonesia International, and claimed her first Grand Prix title in 2016 Vietnam Open. Haris was two times Asian Championships bronze medalists winning in 2018 and 2019.

Awards and nominations

Achievements

Asian Championships 
Women's doubles

BWF World Junior Championships 
Mixed doubles

Asian Junior Championships 
Mixed doubles

BWF World Tour (1 title, 1 runner-up) 
The BWF World Tour, which was announced on 19 March 2017 and implemented in 2018, is a series of elite badminton tournaments sanctioned by the Badminton World Federation (BWF). The BWF World Tour is divided into levels of World Tour Finals, Super 1000, Super 750, Super 500, Super 300 (part of the HSBC World Tour), and the BWF Tour Super 100.

Women's doubles

BWF Grand Prix (2 titles, 4 runners-up) 
The BWF Grand Prix had two levels, the Grand Prix and Grand Prix Gold. It was a series of badminton tournaments sanctioned by the Badminton World Federation (BWF) and played between 2007 and 2017.

Women's doubles

  BWF Grand Prix Gold tournament
  BWF Grand Prix tournament

BWF International Challenge/Series (5 titles, 1 runner-up) 
Women's doubles

  BWF International Challenge tournament
  BWF International Series tournament

Performance timeline

National team 
 Junior level

 Senior level

Individual competitions 
 Junior level

 Senior level

References

External links 
 

1992 births
Living people
Sportspeople from Jakarta
Indonesian female badminton players
Badminton players at the 2018 Asian Games
Asian Games bronze medalists for Indonesia
Asian Games medalists in badminton
Medalists at the 2018 Asian Games
21st-century Indonesian women
20th-century Indonesian women